Lynceus is a genus of clam shrimp in the family Lynceidae. There are about 13 described species in Lynceus.

Species
These 13 species belong to the genus Lynceus:

 Lynceus aequatorialis Daday, 1927 i g
 Lynceus andronachensis Botnariuc, 1947 g
 Lynceus biformis (Ishikawa, 1895) g
 Lynceus brachyurus O. F. Müller, 1776 i g b (holarctic clam shrimp)
 Lynceus brevifrons (Packard, 1877) i g
 Lynceus gracilicornis (Packard, 1871) i g
 Lynceus insularis Olesen, Pöllabauer, Sigvardt & Rogers, 2016 g
 Lynceus mallinensis Pessacq, Epele & Rogers, 2011 g
 Lynceus mucronatus (Packard, 1875) i g
 Lynceus quadrangularis Leydig, 1860 g
 Lynceus rostratus Koch, 1841 g
 Lynceus rotundirostris (Daday, 1902) i g
 Lynceus tropicus Daday, 1927 i g

Data sources: i = ITIS, c = Catalogue of Life, g = GBIF, b = Bugguide.net

References

Further reading

 
 

Diplostraca
Articles created by Qbugbot